The term ecological reserve is used for various protected areas of Brazil administered by the federal government, states and municipalities of Brazil that provide some degree of protection of the environment, although they do not conform to IUCN protected area categories. They include:

References

Types of protected area of Brazil